Results of India national football team from 2000 to 2009.

2000

2001

2002

2003

2004

2005

2006

2007

2008

2009

See also
Indian women's national football team results (2000–2009)
India national football team results (1990–1999)
India national football team results (2010–2019)

References

Football
2000